BaBalu is the debut studio album released independently by Canadian singer, Michael Bublé. It was released in 2001.

Background
Bublé stated that his interest in singing jazz and swing standards stems from his listening to old Mills Brothers recordings, as is evident on albums such as BaBalu, where he actually re-records several Mills Brothers hits, such as "Lazy River." Bublé says, "Although I like rock 'n' roll and modern music, the first time my granddad played me the Mills Brothers, something magical happened. The lyrics were so romantic, so real, the way a song should be for me. It was like seeing my future flash before me. I wanted to be a singer and I knew that this was the music that I wanted to sing." The track "Spiderman Theme" was later remixed by Junkie XL, released as a single and also used in the movie Spider-Man 2. "Spider-Man" is misspelled on the original album packaging, excluding the hyphen that falls between Spider and Man.

Inspiration
The title, BaBalu, refers to the Vancouver night club where Bublé regularly performed in the late 1990s before gaining broad recognition outside of his home town. The club has since become Doolin's Irish Pub, located on Granville Street at Nelson. The word Babalu is a reference to Margarita Lecuona's song "Babalu" popularized by famous Cuban big band singers Miguelito Valdés and Desi Arnaz. Also seen, as such, with the character of Ricky Ricardo (played by Desi Arnaz) on the classic TV comedy series I Love Lucy. The word originally refers to "Babalú-ayé", an orisha or deity in the Santería religion. The album title informally written as Babalu is often seen written as BaBalu because on the album art, the second B is also capitalized. The Vancouver night club and lounge, BaBalu, after which the album is named, was also written with the second B capitalized.

Track listing

Notes
 Capitalization as printed on the album.
 Spelled as "Buena Sera" on the album, the song's official spelling is "Buona Sera".

References

2001 debut albums
Michael Bublé albums
Self-released albums